Hannu Erkki Johannes Koskinen (born 10 December 1954) is a Finnish politician and a lawyer as profession. He is a member of the Social Democratic Party of Finland (SDP).

Koskinen was born in Janakkala. He has been a member of the Parliament of Finland from Tavastia Proper since 1991 and served as the minister of justice in two Lipponen cabinets, Jäätteenmäki cabinet and first Vanhanen cabinet from April 1999 to March 2005. He was replaced as minister of justice by Leena Luhtanen in a cabinet reshuffle.

He has been a member of Hämeenlinna city council 1989–2004 and again since 2009.

He served one of the deputy speakers of the Parliament of Finland.

References

External links

1954 births
Living people
People from Janakkala
Finnish Lutherans
Social Democratic Party of Finland politicians
Ministers of Justice of Finland
Members of the Parliament of Finland (1991–95)
Members of the Parliament of Finland (1995–99)
Members of the Parliament of Finland (1999–2003)
Members of the Parliament of Finland (2003–07)
Members of the Parliament of Finland (2007–11)
Members of the Parliament of Finland (2011–15)
Members of the Parliament of Finland (2019–23)